The 1987 FIVB Women's U20 World Championship was held in Seoul and Pusan, South Korea from September 2 to 13, 1987. 13 teams participated in the tournament.

Qualification process 

 * Cuba declined to participate because their players lost to many school days when participating in the Panamerican Games.
 ** Greece replaced East Germany.
 *** Chinese Taipei replaced Thailand.

Pools composition 

  declined to participate.

Preliminary round

Pool A 

|}

|}

Pool B 

|}

|}

Final round

9th–12th places

Classification 9th and 12th

Classification 11th

Classification 9th

5th–8th places

Classification 5th and 8th

Classification 7th

Classification 5th

Championship round

Semifinals

Bronze medal match

Gold medal match

Final standing

Individual awards 

 MVP:  Ana Moser
 Best Attacker:  Gabriela Perez del Solar
 Best Rookie:  Ana Moser
 Best Blocker:  Kerly Santos
 Best Server:  Marcia Fu
 Best Setter:  Simone Storm
 Best Coach:  Marco Aurelio Motta

External links 
 Informational website.

World Championship
Volleyball
FIVB Volleyball Women's U20 World Championship
1987 in youth sport